Margit Fredrikke Tveiten (born 27 August 1961) is a Norwegian diplomat.

She was born in Kristiansand and is a cand.mag. and cand.jur. by education. She started working for the Norwegian Ministry of Foreign Affairs in 1988, and had a stint in the European Bank for Reconstruction and Development from 1992 to 1994. From 2004 to 2007 she led the Parliament of Norway International Secretariat, before embarking on a period as Norwegian ambassador to Iceland from 2007 to 2010. After four years as subdirector and three years as deputy under-secretary in the Ministry of Foreign Affairs she served as the Norwegian ambassador to Italy from 2017.

References

1961 births
Living people
People from Kristiansand
Norwegian civil servants
Norwegian expatriates in the United Kingdom
Ambassadors of Norway to Iceland
Ambassadors of Norway to Italy
Norwegian women ambassadors